The 1993–94 Polska Liga Hokejowa season was the 59th season of the Polska Liga Hokejowa, the top level of ice hockey in Poland. 10 teams participated in the league, and Podhale Nowy Targ won the championship.

Final round

Qualification round

Playoffs

Relegation round

Relegation 
 Stocznowiec Gdansk - BTH Bydgoszcz 2:2/3:1

External links
 Season on hockeyarchives.info

Polska Hokej Liga seasons
Polska
Polska